Travon is a given name. Notable people with the name include:

Travon Bellamy (born 1988), American football player
Travon Broadway Jr. (born 1997), American basketball player
Travon Bryant (born 1983),  American basketball coach and former player
Travon Free (born 1984/1985), American comedian and basketball player
Travon Potts (born 1970), American songwriter and producer
Travon Smart (1997–2018), American rapper
Travon Van (born 1991), American football player
Travon Walker (born 2000), American football player

See also
Trayvon
Trevon